Komatireddy Venkat Reddy (born 23 May 1965) is an Indian politician from Telangana. He is the Member of Parliament of Bhuvanagiri Parliament Constituency from 2019. He is the star campaigner of Telangana Pradesh Congress Committee from 2022. He was Deputy Floor Leader, Telangana Congress Legislative Party and former MLA of Nalgonda Assembly constituency.

Early life and education 

Komatireddy Venkat Reddy was born on 23 May 1965 as the 8th of the nine children of a farmer, Papi Reddy in Brahmana Vellemla village, Narketpally, Nalgonda district, Telangana. Komatireddy Venkat Reddy attended Amarajeevi Potti Sreeramulu High School, Malakpet, Hyderabad in 1980 for his SSC. Later he completed his Intermediate from N.B. Science College, Pathargatti, Hyderabad in the year 1982. He is a notable alumni of Chaitanya Bharathi Institute of Technology, Hyderabad in 1986 where he pursued Bachelors of Civil Engineering (BE).

Political career

Youth Politics

Right from the inception of his career, Komatireddy Venkat Reddy was actively involved in Youth Politics. He always believed that societal change is unprecedented in its pace, scope and depth of impact and everyone is bound to get into reforming it the right way. During his graduation in 1986, he acted as NSUI District Incharge and brought in new agendas such as educational and university reforms.

Positions Held 

Komatireddy won as a candidate from Nalgonda assembly constituency four times, in 1999, 2004, 2009 and 2014. He was a Minister for Information Technology in YS Rajasekhar Reddy's government. He served as minister for ports. In 2019 he was again elected as Member of Parliament from Bhuvanagiri constituency.

Venkat Reddy has held the following positions;

Philanthropy
The Komatireddy Prateek Foundation was established by him in memory of his son Prateek Reddy, who met with an accident on 20 December 2011 on Outer Ring Road in Hyderabad. At a cost of Rs 3.5 crore by the Foundation, he undertook the building of the Prateek Memorial Government Junior College for Boys and Vocational Junior College for Girls in Nalgonda. He operates ambulance services under this organization and runs awareness campaigns for road safety. Every year, Komatireddy Prateek Foundation conducts job mela and provide job opportunities to many unemployed youth in Telangana

References

Living people
People from Telangana
Telangana politicians
Telangana MLAs 2014–2018
Indian National Congress politicians
Telugu politicians
1965 births
India MPs 2019–present